The  Little League World Series took place between August 20 and August 24 in Williamsport, Pennsylvania. The Kaohsiung Little League of Kaohsiung, Taiwan, defeated the Red Bluff Little League of Red Bluff, California, in the championship game of the 28th Little League World Series.

This was the fourth consecutive title for Taiwan. It remains is the second-longest winning streak by any single country or U.S. state (the longest winning streak is five, also by Taiwan, during 1977–1981). After this series, foreign teams were banned from the competition; however, the ban was rescinded one year later, allowing foreign teams to qualify for the  series. Foreign teams have continued to participate in each edition of the tournament, except for  due to the COVID-19 pandemic.

This was the last LLWS to match U.S. teams with international teams in the opening round of play.  This was also the first, and only, LLWS to feature shutouts in all first-round and second-round games of the winner's bracket. The elimination game between Jackson, Tennessee, and Maracaibo, Venezuela, was the first LLWS game scoreless after six innings of regulation play. The game ended in the seventh inning with a walk-off home run in favor of Venezuela. This record stood until the  international championship game, between Mexico and Japan. After the tournament, all teams were invited to Washington, D.C., and were the first official guests greeted by newly inaugurated President Gerald Ford.

Teams

Championship bracket

Consolation bracket

Notable players
 Gale Gilbert of Red Bluff went on to play in the NFL as a quarterback between 1985 and 1995.

References

External links
1974 Little League World Series
Line scores for the 1974 LLWS

Little League World Series
Little League World Series
Little League World Series